The Monster is a 1954 Egyptian crime film directed by Salah Abouseif. It was entered into the 1954 Cannes Film Festival. It was one of the first films to be labelled as a "social thriller" by cinema writer Georges Sadoul for its use of documentary style, depictions of police abuse, and backdrop of life in the Egyptian countryside.

Cast
 Anwar Wagdi
 Mahmoud El-Meliguy as Ell Wahsh
 Samia Gamal
 Abbas Fares

References

External links

1954 films
1954 crime films
1950s Arabic-language films
Egyptian black-and-white films
Films directed by Salah Abu Seif
Egyptian crime films